Patrick Boyle may refer to:

Patrick Boyle (footballer) (born 1987), Scottish footballer
Patrick Boyle (writer) (1905–1982), Irish novelist
Patrick Boyle, 8th Earl of Glasgow (1874–1963), Scottish nobleman and far right political activist
Patrick Boyle, 10th Earl of Glasgow (born 1939), British peer, politician and the current chief of Clan Boyle
Patrick J. Boyle, Canadian judge
Patrick Boyle (publisher) (1832–1901), printer and publisher in Toronto, Canada
Patrick Boyle (financier) (born 1976), British academic, author and fund manager

See also
Patrick O'Boyle (disambiguation)